Sobków  is a village in Jędrzejów County, Świętokrzyskie Voivodeship, in south-central Poland. It is the seat of the gmina (administrative district) called Gmina Sobków.

The village has an approximate population of 870, and is located on the left bank of the Nida river. It was founded as a city in 1563 by Grand Treasurer of the Crown Stanisław Sobek, and lost its city rights in 1869. Sobkow has a rail station, which is located three kilometers northwest of the village, along a main line from Kraków to Kielce.

The name of the village comes from Stanislaw Sobek of Sulejów, who founded it in the area of the village of Nida. Together with the town, Sobek founded a castle, which became main residence of his family. In the 17th and 18th centuries, the town belonged to several families, such as the Drohojewski, the Wielopolski, the Sarbiewski, the Myszkowski, and the Szaniawski (since 1725). Sobków remained a small town, whose development was limited due to proximity of well-established local urban and trade centers at Checiny and Jędrzejów. In 1667, while part of Sandomierz Voivodeship, it had only 32 houses, with the population of 270. After the Partitions of Poland (1795), it belonged to the Russian-controlled Congress Poland (1815 - 1915), and in 1827, its population was app, 1,000. Following the example of many other places in northern Lesser Poland, Sobków lost its town charter in 1869, after the January Uprising. During World War I, the village was completely burned (1915). 
  
Most interesting sight at Sobków is a fortified castle, called Fortalicja sobkowska. It was built on the left bank of the Nida by Stanislaw Sobek, in 1560-1570. The castle is surrounded by a rectangular wall, with towers in each corner. Inside the walls the castle once stood. The original castle was replaced by a Classicistic complex in 1767. Now it is in ruins. Furthermore, Sobków has the St. Stanislaus church, built in the mid-16th century as a Calvinist prayer house. In ca. 1570 the house was handed over to Roman Catholic Church by Stanislaw Sobek, the son of the founder. The church has the shape of a cross, with a Baroque main altar and 18th century epitaphs. Damaged during World War II, the church was remodelled in 1945-1946.

References

Villages in Jędrzejów County
Sandomierz Voivodeship
Kielce Governorate
Kielce Voivodeship (1919–1939)